This is a list of fossiliferous stratigraphic units in Paraguay.



List of fossiliferous stratigraphic units

See also 

 
 South American land mammal age
 Gomphothere fossils in Paraguay
 List of fossiliferous stratigraphic units in Bolivia

References

Further reading 
 L. E. Babcock, J. Gray, A. J. Boucot, G. T. Himes, and P. K. Siegele. 1990. First Silurian conulariids from Paraguay. Journal of Paleontology 64(6):897-902
 J. L. Benedetto, K. Halpern, and J. C. Galeano Inchausti. 2013. High-latitude Hirnantian (latest Ordovician) brachiopods from the Eusebio Ayala Formation of Paraguay, Paraná Basin. Palaeontology 56(1):61-78
 A. J. Boucot, J. H. G. Melo, E. V. Santos Neto and S. Wolff. 1991. First Clarkeia and Heterorthella (Brachiopoda; Lower Silurian) occurrence from the Parana Basin in eastern Paraguay. Journal of Paleontology 65(3):512-514
 H. J. Harrington. 1972. Silurian of Paraguay. Geological Society of America Special Paper 133:41-50
 S. de Valais, V. Filippi, S. Molinas and R. Souberlich. 2012. Descripción de una huella de terópodo de la Formación Misiones: primer fósil mesozoico fidedigno de Paraguay [Description of a theropod footprint from the Misiones Formation: first reliable Mesozoic fossil from Paraguay]. Andean Geology 39(3):541-547
 L. V. Warren, T. R. Fairchild, C. Gaucher, P. C. Boggiani, D. G. Poire, L. E. Anelli, and J. C. G. Inchausti. 2011. Corumbella and in situ Cloudina in association with thrombolites in the Ediacaran Itapucumi Group, Paraguay. Terra Nova 23:382-389
 

.Paraguay
 
 
Fossil
Fossil